Joshua Oghenetega Peter Onomah (born 27 April 1997) is an English professional footballer who plays as a midfielder for EFL Championship club Preston North End, having previously represented  club Fulham. 

Onomah came through the academy system at Tottenham Hotspur, and was a regular youth international for England, including winning the 2017 FIFA U-20 World Cup and the 2014 UEFA European Under-17 Championship.

Club career

Tottenham Hotspur
Born in Enfield, Greater London, Onomah came through the academy system at Tottenham Hotspur. He was first called up for the first team on 5 January 2015, remaining an unused substitute in their 1–1 draw away to Burnley in the FA Cup third round, and made his debut nine days later in the replay, replacing Andros Townsend for the last 15 minutes of a 4–2 victory at White Hart Lane. On 24 May, he was included in the matchday squad for a Premier League game for the first time, remaining unused as Tottenham won 0–1 at Everton in the last game of the season.

In the 2015–16 season, Onomah changed his shirt number to 25, which was included on the club's list of first-team numbers. He made his Premier League debut in a 3–1 home victory over Aston Villa on 2 November 2015, replacing Dele Alli for the final minutes. On 10 December, Onomah made his first start for Tottenham playing 90 minutes in a 4–1 victory over AS Monaco.

On 4 August 2017, Onomah joined Aston Villa on loan for the season. He scored his first goal for Aston Villa in a 1–1 draw at Bristol City on 25 August 2017.

On 31 August 2018, Onomah joined Championship side Sheffield Wednesday on loan for the season.

Fulham
On the final day of the 2019 transfer window Onomah joined Fulham, as part of the £25 million transfer that saw Ryan Sessegnon move in the other direction. He scored his first goal for Fulham in a 2–1 win over Leeds United on 21 December 2019.

On 27 July 2020, Onomah scored a solo goal to open the scoring against Cardiff in the first leg of their EFL Championship play-off semi-final. The match ended in a 2–0 win for Fulham. After making just 39 appearances for Fulham over the next 30 months, Onomah's contract was mutually terminated on 31 January 2023.

Preston North End 
On 31 January 2023, Preston announced they had signed Onomah on a short term deal until the end of the season.

International career
Onomah has represented England up to the under-21 level. In May 2014, Onomah was part of the England squad that won the 2014 UEFA European Under-17 Championship, playing the full 90 minutes in the final against the Netherlands. In 2015, Onomah scored the equaliser against Croatia U-19 in a 1–1 draw. During the elite round of 2016 UEFA European Under-19 Championship qualification, held in March 2016, Onomah scored in wins against Georgia and group hosts Spain as England qualified for the final tournament by winning the group.

Onomah represented England at the 2016 UEFA European Under-19 Championship and made 4 appearances in the tournament where England finished semi-finalists.

2017 FIFA U-20 World Cup
Onomah was in the England under-20 team in the 2017 FIFA U-20 World Cup. He received a red card in the quarter-finals match against Mexico, so he missed the semi-final against Italy. He returned for the final where England beat Venezuela 1–0, which is England's first win in a global tournament since their World Cup victory of 1966.

Club statistics

Honours
Fulham
EFL Championship: 2021–22
EFL Championship play-offs: 2020

England U17
UEFA European Under-17 Championship: 2014

England U20
FIFA U-20 World Cup: 2017

References

External links
Josh Onomah profile at the Tottenham Hotspur F.C. website
Josh Onomah profile at the Football Association website

1997 births
Living people
Footballers from the London Borough of Enfield
English footballers
Association football midfielders
Tottenham Hotspur F.C. players
Aston Villa F.C. players
Sheffield Wednesday F.C. players
Fulham F.C. players
Premier League players
English Football League players
England youth international footballers
England under-21 international footballers
Black British sportspeople
English people of Nigerian descent